Christen Eriksen Berg (20 November 1864 – 5 August 1926) was a Norwegian telegrapher and politician.

He was born in Brevik to Andreas Gerhard Berg and Gina Thomsen. He served as mayor of Kragerø (1921). He was elected representative to the Storting for the period 1922–1924, for the Liberal Party.

References

1864 births
1926 deaths
Politicians from Porsgrunn
People from Kragerø
Liberal Party (Norway) politicians
Members of the Storting
Mayors of places in Telemark